Ernst Leopold Eduard Wilhelm Josias Prinz von Sachsen-Coburg und Gotha (14 January 1935 – 27 June 1996) was the second child and eldest son of Johann Leopold, Hereditary Prince of Saxe-Coburg and Gotha and Feodora Freiin von der Horst.

Early life
Ernst Leopold was born at Hirschberg. His paternal grandparents were Charles Edward, Duke of Saxe-Coburg and Gotha, the only son of Prince Leopold, Duke of Albany (youngest son of Queen Victoria), and his wife, Princess Victoria Adelaide of Schleswig-Holstein-Sonderburg-Glücksburg.

Ernst Leopold had two siblings: Marianne and Peter.

His father was heir-apparent to the Duchy of Saxe-Coburg and Gotha until the forced abdication of his grandfather on 18 November 1918, to Saxe-Coburg and Gotha, result of the German Revolution. As the marriage of his parents was considered morganatic his father lost any rights to the succession of the ducal throne of Saxe-Coburg and Gotha, but was not barred from petitioning the British Crown for the revival of the Dukedom of Albany. The children of their morganatic marriage are surnamed Prinz or Prinzessin von Sachsen-Coburg und Gotha.

Marriage and family
Ernst Leopold married Ingeborg Henig (b. 16 August 1937 in Nordhausen), daughter of Richard Henig and Luise Duckwitz, on 4 February 1961 in Herrenberg. They divorced on 26 March 1963. They had one child: 
 Hubertus Prinz von Sachsen-Coburg und Gotha (8 December 1961); he married Barbara Weissmann on 9 March 1993 and they were divorced on 12 September 2012. They have one son.

He married, secondly, Gertraude Monika Pfeiffer (b. 1 July 1938 in Cottbus), daughter of Hermann Horst Pfeiffer and wife Gertrud Marianne Jardin, on 29 May 1963, at Regensburg, Germany. They divorced on 20 September 1985. They had five children: 
Viktoria Feodora Monika Prinzessin von Sachsen-Coburg und Gotha (b. 7 September 1963) she married Peter Schmidt on 26 November 1986, he took the surname "Prinz von Sachsen-Coburg und Gotha", and they were divorced on 30 September 1999. They have one son. She remarried Gerd Armbrust on 29 April 2000, without issue.
Falk Wilhelm Philipp Albert Jakob Schmidt then Prinz von Sachsen-Coburg und Gotha (b. 28 June 1990)
Ernst-Josias Carl Eduard Hermann Leopold Prinz von Sachsen-Coburg und Gotha (b. 13 May 1965 - d. 4 September 2009) he married Birgit Michaela Marion Meissner on 5 July 1996. They have one daughter: 
Sophie Alexandra Maria Katherina Prinzessin von Sachsen-Coburg und Gotha (b. 22 August 2000)
Carl-Eduard Wilhelm Josias Prinz von Sachsen-Coburg und Gotha (b. 7 July 1966) he married Miriam Stephanie Kolo on 25 September 1998. They have two daughters: 
Emilia Lucia Josefina Prinzessin von Sachsen-Coburg und Gotha (b. 24 March 1999)
Johanna Carlotta Sophia Prinzessin von Sachsen-Coburg und Gotha (b. 16 August 2004)
Friedrich Ferdinand-Christian Georg Ernst Albert Prinz von Sachsen-Coburg und Gotha (b. 13 December 1968) he married Erika Ostheimer on 14 May 1999. They have one son, born before their marriage and thus, as a legitimated son, excluded from both the succession to the British throne and to the revival of the Dukedom of Albany: 
Nicolaus Prinz von Sachsen-Coburg und Gotha (b. 12 October 1987)
Alice-Sybilla Calma Beatrice Prinzessin von Sachsen-Coburg und Gotha (b. 6 August 1974), she married Gerold Hans Carl Franz Reiser on 9 July 2001. They have two children born before their marriage and thus, as legitimated children, excluded from the succession to the British throne, Matthias Reiser (b. 19 April 1999) and Carolin Monika Maria Reiser (b. 19 August 2000)

He married, thirdly, Sabine Margarete Biller (25 June 1941 – 27 June 1996 in Kreuth), daughter of Alfred Carl Biller, on 20 January 1986 in Grünwald, without issue. They had no children.

Death
Ernst Leopold died on 27 June 1996 in Bad Wiessee, Germany, aged 61, by committing suicide along with his wife Sabine Biller.

References

1935 births
1996 suicides
People from Saale-Orla-Kreis
House of Saxe-Coburg and Gotha (United Kingdom)
Princes of Saxe-Coburg and Gotha
Joint suicides
Suicides in Germany